Marco may refer to:

People
 Marco (given name), people with the given name Marco
 Marco (actor) (born 1977), South Korean model and actor
 Georg Marco (1863–1923), Romanian chess player of German origin
 Tomás Marco (born 1942), Spanish composer and writer on music

Places
 Marco, Ceará, Brazil, a municipality
 Marco, New Zealand, a locality in the Taranaki Region
 Marco, Indiana, United States, an unincorporated town
 Marco, Missouri, United States, an unincorporated community
 Marco Island, Florida, United States, a city and an island

Science and technology
 Mars Cube One (MarCO), a pair of small satellites which fly by Mars in 2018
 MARCO, a macrophage receptor protein that in humans is encoded by the MARCO gene
 Mid-Atlantic Regional Council on the Ocean (MARCO)
 Marco, the official window manager of MATE

Arts and entertainment
 Marco: 3000 Leagues in Search of Mother, a 1976 Japanese anime series, directed by Isao Takahata
 Marco (film), a 1973 American adventure film directed by Seymour Robbie
 Marco (comics), a fictional character in the DC Comics universe
 Marco Pagot, the main protagonist in Porco Rosso
 Marco (Animorphs), one of the six main characters in the book series Animorphs
 Marco, a character in the animated family comedy film Chibi Maruko-chan: A Boy From Italy
 "Marco" (Better Call Saul), an episode of Better Call Saul
 Marco (Marco Borsato album), 1994
 Marco (Marco Antonio Solís album), 1997
 Museo de Arte Contemporáneo de Monterrey (MARCO), the Museum of Contemporary Art in Monterrey, Mexico

Other uses
 F.C. Marco, a former football club from Marco de Canaveses, Portugal
 Hurricane Marco
 Tropical Storm Marco

See also
 Marko (disambiguation)